Gideon Waja (born December 15, 1996) is a Ghanaian footballer who most recently played as a midfielder for Toronto FC II in USL League One.

He also featured for Ghana Premier League club WAFA before a move to Canada in 2018. After being capped three times for Ghana Under-17s, he made his senior international debut in May 2017.

Professional career

WAFA 
Waja began his career in the Feyenoord Fetteh Football Academy, which was re-branded as the West African Football Academy in 2014.

He captained the team to second place in the 2017 Ghana Premier League season. Falling six points short of champions Aduana Stars, it proved to be their best ever finish having been promoted back to the league in 2015.

In November 2017, WAFA Operations Manager George Ofoshuene admitted it was unlikely Waja would remain with the club next season. New York City FC and Toronto FC were both linked as potentially interested clubs. On February 16, 2018, WAFA revealed that a deal had been agreed between Waja and Toronto FC.

Toronto FC II 
On February 20, United Soccer League club Toronto FC II confirmed the signing of Waja on an international spot.

International career 
Waja has been capped three times for Ghana Under-17s.

On May 25, 2017, Waja made his international debut at senior level in a 1–1 draw against Benin. In September 2017, he was called up for two FIFA World Cup qualifying matches against Congo but was an unused substitute in both matches.

Career statistics

International goals
Scores and results list Ghana's goal tally first.

References

External links 
 
 Gideon Waja at Toronto FC

1996 births
Living people
Ghanaian footballers
Ghanaian expatriate footballers
Ghana international footballers
Association football midfielders
Toronto FC II players
USL League One players